Kentucky Route 172 (KY 172) is a  state highway in Kentucky that runs from U.S. Route 460 (US 460) and KY 7 in western West Liberty to KY 40 northwest of Paintsville.

Major intersections

References

0172
Transportation in Morgan County, Kentucky
Transportation in Johnson County, Kentucky